The 1988 Nepal earthquake occurred in Nepal near the Indian border and affected much of northern Bihar. The magnitude 6.9 earthquake shook the region on August 21, killing at least 709 persons and injuring thousands. The earthquake struck in two installments of 10 seconds and 15 seconds each and left cracks in 50,000 buildings, including Raj Bhavan and the old Secretariat Building in Patna, Bihar.

See also
List of earthquakes in 1988
List of earthquakes in India
List of earthquakes in Nepal

References

External links 
 M6.9 - Nepal-India border region – United States Geological Survey
 Earthquakes in Bihar, India –  Amateur Seismic Centre
 

1988
Nepal Earthquake, 1988
1988
1988 earthquakes
Natural disasters in Bihar
Earthquake
History of Bihar (1947–present)
August 1988 events in Asia